|}

The Bosra Sham Stakes is a Listed flat horse race in Great Britain open to fillies aged two years only.
It is run on the Rowley Mile course at Newmarket over a distance of 6 furlongs (1,206 metres), and it is scheduled to take place each year in late October or early November.

The race was first run in 2003 and is named in honour of the racehorse Bosra Sham.

Winners

See also
 Horse racing in Great Britain
 List of British flat horse races

References 
Racing Post: 

Flat races in Great Britain
Newmarket Racecourse
Flat horse races for two-year-olds
2003 establishments in England
Recurring sporting events established in 2003